The 5th Miss Chinese International Pageant, Miss Chinese International Pageant 1993 was held on January 10, 1993 in Hong Kong. The pageant was organized and broadcast by TVB in Hong Kong. Miss Chinese International 1992 Rosemary Chan crowned Christy Chung of Montréal, Quebec, Canada as the winner.

Pageant information
The theme to this year's pageant continues to be "The Traditions of the Dragon, The Embodiment of Beauty" 「龍的傳統  俏的化身」.  The Masters of Ceremonies were Eric Tsang and Philip Chan.

Results

Special awards
Miss Friendship: Stephanie Chang 張念先 (Seattle)
Miss Handsome Looking: Christy Chung 鍾麗緹 (Montréal)

Contestant list

Crossovers
Contestants who previously competed or will be competing at other international beauty pageants:

Miss World
 1992:  Macau  : Yuk-Yee HO

Miss Universe
 1993: : Emily Lo

External links
 Johnny's Pageant Page - Miss Chinese International Pageant 1993

TVB
Miss Chinese International Pageants
1993 beauty pageants
1993 in Hong Kong
Beauty pageants in Hong Kong